Pitt County Courthouse is a historic courthouse building located at Greenville, Pitt County, North Carolina.  It was designed and built in 1910 by the architectural firm of Milburn, Heister & Company, and is a three-story, rectangular, Classical Revival style tan brick building.  The front facade features a tetrastyle Ionic order portico, a hipped roof, and dominating three-stage cupola.

It was added to the National Register of Historic Places in 1979.  It is located in the Greenville Commercial Historic District.

References

County courthouses in North Carolina
Courthouses on the National Register of Historic Places in North Carolina
Neoclassical architecture in North Carolina
Government buildings completed in 1910
Buildings and structures in Pitt County, North Carolina
National Register of Historic Places in Greenville, North Carolina
Historic district contributing properties in North Carolina